Benjamin Silva-Netto (born 27 April 1939) is a Filipino long-distance runner. He competed in the marathon at the 1968 Summer Olympics. He is the first Filipino to compete in a marathon event at the Summer Olympics.

Career 
Before his participation at the 1968 Summer Olympics, Silva-Netto competed in the first full marathon recorded to be held in the country which took place in Roxas, Capiz. He won the race which took place also in 1968.

By 2012, Silva-Netto is the secretary general of the Philippine Amateur Track and Field Association. He resides in Manila but also spends almost a half a year residing in the United States in New Jersey as an immigrant. He is married and has a single daughter.

References

External links
 

1939 births
Living people
Athletes (track and field) at the 1968 Summer Olympics
Filipino male long-distance runners
Filipino male marathon runners
Filipino expatriates in the United States
Olympic track and field athletes of the Philippines
Sportspeople from Naga, Camarines Sur